Kaldhol is a Norwegian surname. Notable people with the surname include:

Marit Kaldhol (born 1955), Norwegian poet and children's writer
Ottar Kaldhol (born 1946), Norwegian politician

Norwegian-language surnames